The Munich Science Days (German: Münchner Wissenschaftstage) are a yearly four-day event in Munich since 2001.

History 
The Munich Science Days were led until 2008 by Karl Daumer and until 2007 were organized by the Association of German biologists. In 2008, the Müncher Wissenschaftstage e. V. assoziation was founded and has organized the event since then.

The assoziation includes representatives of the major scientific institutions from the Munich area, including all universities in Munich, Max Planck Society, Fraunhofer Society, German Aerospace Center, Helmholtz Zentrum München and others. In 2008 Frank Holl took over as lead, and the Managing Director since then is Steffi Bucher.

Venue 
Central venue areas of the previous events were the Marienhof (2001), the Technische Universität München (2002-2003), the Bundesgartenschau (2005) and the Ludwig Maximilian University of Munich (2004, 2006-2008, 2010, 2011). In 2009, the Munich Science Days decentralized and took place in more than 50 locations in the greater Munich area. In 2012 the event took place at the Alte Kongresshalle at Theresienhöhe  and Deutsches Museum for the first time.

At the Munich Science Days, experts from research groups, organizations, and institutes are prepared to explain, through dialogues, the sometimes difficult issues of science and technology, and to discuss questions of actual and perceived risks and benefits with visitors.

Lectures, discussions, panel discussions, workshops, films, exhibitions, Science booths, field trips, open house, and tours are offered during the event.

In conjunction to the event, are other events that take place at about 30 to 40other locations in and around Munich. The educational channel ARD-alpha records lectures and broadcasts them as a series since 2011. They can then be accessed in the Multimedia library of Bayerischer Rundfunk.

Participation in all events is free.

The Munich Science Days have become a permanent fixture in Bavaria, and attracts about 25,000 interested visitors annually and encourages participants to think and ask.

Themes 
 2001: Life Science live
 2002: Living Earth
 2003: Threads of life
 2004: Life and Technology
 2005: Light and Life
 2006: Living Research
 2007: Life and Culture
 2008: Mathematics – in the midst of life
 2009: Ideas for the Future
 2010: Energy: Basis of Life - Motor for the future
 2011: Health Challenge!
 2012: Sustainability - the basis of our future
 2013: change in society - change the world
 2014: Digital Worlds
 2015: Cities of the Future

References

External links 
 Münchner Wissenschaftstage

Munich
Ludwig Maximilian University of Munich